Percy Roberts may refer to:

Percy Roberts (Australian footballer) (1909 - 1943), Australian rules footballer
Percy Roberts (Welsh footballer), Welsh association footballer